The London School of Dramatic Art is a drama school based in South Kensington in London that offers training for those intending to pursue a professional career in acting.

The School
The School was initially set up by actor Jake Taylor and casting director Urvashi Chand.  Jake, a graduate of Drama Centre, London, is currently the Principal. Urvashi is co-director, while continuing her work as a casting director. One of the main accents of the school's philosophy is that all the tutors are working professionals as opposed to permanent teaching staff. Previous staff have included Helen Dallimore, Alicya Eyo and Ruth Carney.

Courses
LSDA runs intensive courses that cover the work of many key practitioners (Konstantin Stanislavski, Sanford Meisner, Uta Hagen) as well as industry skills to prepare for a working life as a professional actor.

Noel Clarke
In the early 2010s Noel Clarke ran a number of workshops at the LSDA. In April 2021 twenty women made allegations of verbal abuse, bullying and sexual harassment against him, including former students of the LSDA. Jake Taylor confirmed he had received complaints of Clarke's behaviour, saying he acted swiftly and “stopped (Clarke) doing the classes.” Lawyers acting on behalf of Clarke denied that the LSDA had ever asked him to stop giving his classes. In response to allegations Clarke said, “In a 20-year career, I have put inclusivity and diversity at the forefront of my work and never had a complaint made against me. If anyone who has worked with me has ever felt uncomfortable or disrespected, I sincerely apologise. I vehemently deny any sexual misconduct or wrongdoing and intend to defend myself against these false allegations.” A few days after the initial allegations, by which time the number of women making allegations had risen to 26, Clarke said, “Recent reports, however, have made it clear to me that some of my actions have affected people in ways I did not intend or realise. To those individuals, I am deeply sorry. I will be seeking professional help to educate myself and change for the better.” Jake Taylor said Clarke, ran an "unsanctioned" practical acting workshop where he "set up improvisation exercises in which the students were told they had to get undressed and get ready for bed".

David Game College Group
LSDA is part of the David Game College Group, which includes the London Film Academy, David Game School of Photography and Delamar Academy.  David Game College has been going since the 1970s.

References

External links
Homepage

Drama schools in London